Jaunalūksne Parish is an administrative unit of Alūksne Municipality, Latvia.

Towns, villages and settlements of Jaunalūksne Parish 

Parishes of Latvia
Alūksne Municipality